The Sunheri Mosque, also known as the Talai Mosque, is a late Mughal architecture-era mosque in the Walled City of Lahore, capital of the Pakistani province of Punjab.

Location
Sunehri Mosque is located in the Walled City of Lahore.

History
Unlike the Wazir Khan Mosque and Badshahi Mosque which were built at the zenith of the Mughal Empire in the 17th century, the Sunehri Mosque was built in 1753 when the empire was in decline.

The architect of the mosque was Nawab Bukhari Khan, deputy governor of Lahore during the reign of Muhammad Shah. Local shopkeeper had objected to the construction of a large mosque in a congested area, so Bukhari Khan acquired a fatwa from local religious leaders in order for construction to begin.

Architecture

The mosque was built on a plinth elevated 11 feet off of the bazaars surface, with shops occupying the ground floor beneath the mosque. The shops rents were used to pay for the mosque's upkeep. The architectural style of the mosque reflects influences of Sikh architecture from nearby Amritsar.

The staircase in front of the mosque has 16 steps, and opens up to a small courtyard measuring 65 feet by 43 feet. An ablution tank is in the centre of this courtyard. The prayer chamber measures 40 feet long, and 16 feet wide. The mosque has a gateway, which measures 21.3 metres in length and a courtyard that measures . The marble domes cover seven prayer chambers.

Conservation
In 2011, the Government of Punjab began a  project to restore the mosque with funding from the Ambassadors Fund for Cultural Preservation of the United States of America. Minarets were resurfaced while the domes were re-gilded, while new marble floors were installed.

References

External links

 Sunehri Mosque withering away

Religious buildings and structures completed in 1753
Mosques in Lahore
Mughal mosques
Walled City of Lahore